The 1975 La Costa WCT, also known as the Michelob Classic, was a men's tennis tournament played on outdoor hard courts in La Costa, California in the United States. The tournament was part of Blue Group of the 1975 World Championship Tennis circuit. It was the third edition of the event and was held from February 17 through February 23, 1975. Rod Laver won the singles title.

Finals

Singles
 Rod Laver defeated  Allan Stone 6–2, 6–2

Doubles
 Brian Gottfried /  Raúl Ramírez defeated  Charlie Pasarell /  Roscoe Tanner 7–5, 6–4

References

External links
 ITF tournament edition details

La Costa WCT